"One More Magic Potion" is the second single by Finnish folk metal band Ensiferum. The song comes from their third album, Victory Songs. It was released on 7 February 2007 by Spinefarm.

Track listing
 "One More Magic Potion"
 "Lady in Black" (Uriah Heep cover)

References

2007 singles
Number-one singles in Finland
Ensiferum songs
2007 songs
Spinefarm Records singles